Sven Zitman (born 24 February 2002) is a Dutch professional footballer who plays as a midfielder for PEC Zwolle of the Dutch Eerste Divisie.

Career
Zitman was in the youth academy at Feyenoord before being allowed to leave on a free transfer in March 2022 without making a single senior appearance. Zitman joined up with PEC Zwolle and in October 2022 signed a two and half year professional contract with the club. He made his senior league debut on 7 October, 2022 in a 3-0 defeat against FC Dordrecht. Zitman himself said he was surprised by his fast introduction to the first team and had been expecting to play youth team football for a longer time period after joining.

References

External links

2002 births
Living people
Dutch footballers
PEC Zwolle players
Eerste Divisie players
Association football midfielders